Paul W. Green (born March 6, 1952 in San Antonio, Texas) is a former justice of the Supreme Court of Texas.  He served on the court from November 2, 2004 to August 31, 2020.

Background 
Green graduated with a Bachelor of Arts degree in Business Administration in 1974 from the University of Texas at Austin and received his Juris Doctor in 1977 from St. Mary's University School of Law in San Antonio, with the designation as a "distinguished graduate."  Prior to joining the Supreme Court, Green was a justice for ten years on the Fourth Court of Appeals of Texas, based in San Antonio.

2004 election 
Green won the Republican nomination to his seat on the Court in a contested primary against then-Justice Steven Wayne Smith. Smith, though a new member of the Court at the time, was opposed by then Texas Governor Rick Perry. U.S. Senator John Cornyn, a former Texas Supreme Court Justice himself for seven years, also supported Green over Smith. In 2006, Smith sought to return to the Court by entering the primary contest against recent Perry appointee Don Willett, but Willett won the contested primary vote by a single percentage point.

2010 election 
Green ran for re-election in 2010. With 60 percent of the vote, he defeated William Moody and Tom Oxford in the general election.

2016 election 
Green won re-nomination in the Republican primary on March 1 against Rick Green (no relation), a former member of the Texas House of Representatives from Dripping Springs who is affiliated with David Barton in the group WallBuilders. Justice Green prevailed over Rick Green, 1,077,507 votes (52.1 percent) to 991,785 votes (47.9 percent). Green then defeated the Democrat Dori Contreras Garza in the November 8 general election, 4,758,334 (54.3 percent) to her 3,608,634 (41.2 percent). The Libertarian Party nominee, Tom Oxford, an earlier opponent of Justice Green, polled 288,504 votes (3.3 percent), and the Green candidate, Charles E. Waterbury received 107,731 (1.2 percent).

Retirement
In July 2020, Green announced his retirement from the court, effective August 31, 2020.

References

External links
Justice Green's profile online at the Texas Supreme Court

1952 births
Living people
20th-century American judges
21st-century American judges
Lawyers from San Antonio
McCombs School of Business alumni
People from Austin, Texas
St. Mary's University School of Law alumni
Texas Republicans
Justices of the Texas Supreme Court